Modbury North is a suburb 14 km northeast of Adelaide, capital city of South Australia. 

Modbury North is a suburb in the City of Tea Tree Gully Council area. 

The suburb is bounded by Milne Road in the north, Golden Grove Road in the east and Montague Road in the south. The suburb's western boundary runs parallel with, but midway between, Kelly Road and Nelson Road. 

Dry Creek runs along the eastern boundary of Modbury North and in flows to the creek are stored in the Kingfisher Wetlands Project, a water catchment area that has provided a habitat for birds, insects and lizards. It is a popular recreational space for walking, cycling, and exercising pets.

School
Modbury Primary School is located at 2-18 Golden Grove Road, Modbury North.

Notes

Suburbs of Adelaide